Jean de Poitiers, seigneur de Saint Vallier (c. 1475 – 1529) was a French nobleman best known as the father of Diane de Poitiers, mistress of King Henry II of France.

He was the son of Aymar de Poitiers and Jeanne de La Tour d'Auvergne (sister of John IV, Count of Auvergne, maternal grandfather of  the Queen Catherine de' Medici, wife of Henry II of France).

In 1523 he was implicated in a plot against King Francis I of France, discovered by his son-in-law Louis de Brézé, seigneur d'Anet, and in 1524 he was condemned to death, but reprieved by the king. He was imprisoned in the French castle of Loches and was released in 1526. He died three years later, in 1529. His story was the inspiration for a character in Victor Hugo's 1832 play Le roi s'amuse who became Count Monterone when Francesco Maria Piave and Giuseppe Verdi relocated the plot of their 1851 opera Rigoletto from France to the Duchy of Mantua.

References

1539 deaths
Year of birth uncertain
French nobility